The British Rail Class 88 is a type of mainline mixed traffic electro-diesel locomotive manufactured by Stadler Rail for Direct Rail Services (DRS) in the United Kingdom. The locomotive is part of the Stadler Euro Dual family. It is the first dual-mode locomotive in the UK to use the 25 kV AC electrification.

Amid the fulfillment of DRS' order for the Class 68, Stadler's team proposed the development of a dual-mode locomotive that could be alternatively powered by an onboard diesel engine or via electricity supplied from overhead lines (OHLE). Having been impressed by the concept, DRS opted to place an order for ten Class 88s during September 2013.

Testing of the first Class 88 was undertaken at the Velim Test Centre in the Czech Republic during 2016; these trials proved to be relatively smooth. During July 2016, 88 001 made the type's first official public appearance. During January 2017, 88 002 Prometheus was the first Class 88 to be delivered to the UK. All ten Class 88s were delivered by March 2017. During June 2017, the type entered regular service with DRS; examples have been typically used to haul freight trains, although they are also fitted for hauling passenger services as well.

Background

Origins
During January 2012, Direct Rail Services (DRS) announced that it had ordered a total of 15 new diesel locomotives from Vossloh España (now Stadler Rail). DRS had opted to procure a clean-sheet design after examining various existing alternatives, such as the ubiquitous British Rail Class 66 locomotive, which the company's management determined to be incapable of satisfactorily replacing its ageing fleet of s, largely due to inefficient engines and elevated operating costs. Stadler undertook development of the Class 68 over an 18 month period, during which the company studied several derivatives and modifications, including the use of alternative powerplants. Having presented such proposals to DRS, the latter became particularly interested in the electro-diesel arrangement, as the company's management recognised there was a potential role for a dual-mode locomotive in the UK market.

During September 2013 DRS announced that it had placed an order for a further ten locomotives, which were designated as the Class 88. The most distinctive difference between the Class 88 and the preceding Class 68 was that these new units would harness a dual-mode electro-diesel propulsion system. Accordingly, these locomotives could be powered either via overhead lines (OHLE) or by an onboard diesel engine. In comparison to conventional diesel locomotives, this arrangement enables operational costs to be significantly reduced when diagrammed on routes partially or entirely under OHLE, under which the diesel engine can be deactivated.

Specification
The Class 88 is part of the Stadler Euro Dual family. This is a range of dual-mode locomotives that are fitted both with a pantograph, to collect electricity from overhead wires, and a Caterpillar diesel engine. The UK version is able to run either on electrified lines using the pantograph, which is the UK's standard OHLE current at 25 kV AC, or away from electrified lines with the Caterpillar C27  engine. Dual-mode locomotives have previously been mooted for freight use in the UK, using the "Last Mile" principle, where a primarily electric locomotive is fitted with a small diesel engine to allow locomotives to run without a load to non-electrified freight sidings. However, the Class 88 is a fully dual-mode locomotive, with the diesel engine powerful enough to haul a train on its own, although with only 17.5 percent of the power it would otherwise have in electric mode.

In the majority of its aspects, the Class 88 featured a high degree of commonality with the preceding Class 68, including the use of an identical bodyshell, cab, brakes, bogies, traction equipment, control software; roughly 70 percent of all components are shared between the two classes. The locomotive's engine, which is compliant with the current EU Stage IIIB emission restrictions, has limited available power as a result of the customer's choice to give the Class 88 comparable power to a traditional Class 20.

The Class 88 is outfitted with both dynamic and regenerative braking systems for the locomotive, along with air braking apparatus for the whole train. When applying regenerative braking, up to 4MW of power may be returned to the OHLE via the catenary. For electricity generation while operating under diesel power, the engine drives an additional traction motor that functions as an alternator, thus avoiding the need for installing a bespoke alternator.

Testing and delivery
During April 2016, the first example of the Class, 88 001, was dispatched to the Velim Test Centre in the Czech Republic, which it was subject to a series of proving trials. The vehicle approvals process included the hauling of a 1,500-tonne train, along with repetitive tests under differing conditions to judge performance; particular attention was paid to the switching process between diesel and electric modes. The various electrified lines of the UK feature around 35 different variations of catenary; the interface between these diverse types and the Class 88's pantograph was a critical part of the acceptance process. According to rail industry periodical Rail, the data gathered during the type's trials showed promising results. During July 2016, 88 001 made the class's first official public appearance, while 88 003 was exhibited at InnoTrans two months later.

During January 2017, no. 88 002 Prometheus became the first of the class to be delivered to the UK, arriving via the Port of Southampton and being transferred by road to the Carlisle Kingmoor TMD. 88 002 was initially used for homologation purposes to secure approval from the Rail Safety and Standards Board (RSSB) for the type's operation in the UK. All ten Class 88s were delivered by March 2017. During July 2017, it was announced that the Class 88 had entered into revenue service with DRS in the previous month, three examples having been used to haul freight trains within the first four weeks of operations. Initially, use of the onboard diesel engines was avoided while sufficient training was delivered to all drivers on the class and minor modifications were being made by the manufacturer.

Operation

DRS has procured the Class 88 to serve as a mixed-traffic locomotive, capable of operating both passenger and freight services. Primarily, the type has been used by DRS to haul freight using electric locomotives without the need to hire in electric traction from other operators. As with the Class 68, they are also capable of operating passenger trains.

Even prior to the type entering service, it was decided that the first duty of DRS' Class 88 fleet would be the contracted services between Daventry and Mossend on behalf of the supermarket chain Tesco. The service's path has been timed for an electric locomotive, and previously necessitated the use of a pair of Class 68s working in multiple. Other diagrams for the Class 88 have been focused on those that have previously been run under the wires with diesel traction.

Named locomotives

The names given to Class 88 locomotives are as follows:

Fleet details

References

External links 

 Report of launch event (includes photo)

88
Bo-Bo locomotives
Macosa/Meinfesa/Vossloh Espana locomotives
Standard gauge locomotives of Great Britain
Railway locomotives introduced in 2015
Electro-diesel locomotives of Great Britain